Norbert Jacques (6 June 1880 – 15 May 1954) was a Luxembourgish novelist, journalist, screenwriter, and translator who wrote in German. He was born in Luxembourg-Eich, Luxembourg and died in Koblenz, West Germany. He created the character Dr. Mabuse, who was a feature of some of his novels. Dr. Mabuse, der Spieler, the first novel to feature Mabuse, was one of the bestsellers of its time; it sold over 500,000 copies in Germany. Today, Jacques is known best for Dr. Mabuse. In 1922, he received German citizenship.

Bibliography

Novels

 Dr. Mabuse, der Spieler (1921)
 Ingenieur Mars (1923)
 Mensch gegen Mensch (1924)
 Plüsch und Plümowski (1927) 
 Mabuses Kolonie (1930, fragment) – Never finished. First published in 1994. 
 Das Testament des Dr. Mabuse (1932) – First published in 1950 under the title Dr. Mabuses letztes Spiel. In the late 1980s, it was reprinted under its original title.
 Chemiker Null (1934) – Serialized in 1934. First reprinted in a book in 1994. 
 Leidenschaft: Ein Schiller-Roman (1939)

Short stories

 "Dr. Mabuse auf dem Presseball" (1923)

Translations
 Maurice Renard - Les Mains d'Orlac. Published in German as Orlac’s Hände (1922). 
 Rudyard Kipling - Stalky & Co. Published in German as Staaks und Genossen (1928).
 Rudyard Kipling - Captains Courageous. Published in German as Fischerjungs: Ein Seeroman (1930).
 Hugh Walpole - Jeremy at Crale. Published in German as Jeremy auf der Schule (1931).

Selected filmography
 Dr. Mabuse the Gambler (1922) – Adaptation of Dr. Mabuse, der Spieler.
 Man Against Man (1924) – Adaptation of Mensch gegen Mensch. Screenplay written by Jacques.
 The Bordello in Rio (1927) – Adaptation of Plüsch und Plümowski.
 The Testament of Dr. Mabuse (1933) 
 Friedrich Schiller – The Triumph of a Genius (1940) – Adaptation of Leidenschaft: Ein Schiller-Roman. 
 Blondes for Export (1950) – Adaptation of Plüsch und Plümowski. Screenplay written by Jacques.
 Final Destination: Red Lantern (1960) – Adaptation of Plüsch und Plümowski.
 The Thousand Eyes of Dr. Mabuse (1960) – Based on characters created by Jacques.
 The Return of Doctor Mabuse (1961) – Based on characters created by Jacques.
 The Testament of Dr. Mabuse (1962) – Remake of the 1933 film. 
 The Invisible Dr. Mabuse (1962)
 Scotland Yard Hunts Dr. Mabuse (1963) – Based on characters created by Jacques. 
 The Secret of Dr. Mabuse (1964) a.k.a. The Death Ray of Dr. Mabuse – Based on characters created by Jacques. 
 The Vengeance of Dr. Mabuse (1971) - Spanish film directed by Jesus Franco
 Dr. M (1990) – Adaptation of Dr. Mabuse, der Spieler.

References
Notes

Sources

External links
 
 

1880 births
1954 deaths
Luxembourgian journalists
Male journalists
Luxembourgian novelists
Luxembourgian screenwriters
German male journalists
German male novelists
German male screenwriters
Translators to German
French–German translators
English–German translators
Translators from French
Translators from English
Literary translators
German travel writers
German male short story writers
German short story writers
German non-fiction writers
20th-century German journalists
20th-century German novelists
20th-century German male writers
20th-century German screenwriters
20th-century German translators